The Sonoma tree vole or California red tree mouse (Arborimus pomo) is a species of rodent in the family Cricetidae.  The species is found in northwest California.
The preferred habitat for this primarily arboreal vole is old-growth Douglas-fir forests.

References

External links
Prof Stephen Sillett's Douglas-Fir webpage — with photos taken during canopy research, including Sonoma tree vole nests.

Arborimus
Endemic fauna of California
Mouse, California red tree
Mouse, California red tree
Klamath Mountains
Natural history of the California Coast Ranges
Mammals described in 1991
Taxonomy articles created by Polbot